Aubrey Richmond (born 14 November 1957) is a Guyanese former cyclist. He competed at the 1984 Summer Olympics and the 1992 Summer Olympics. He was the flag bearer for Guyana at the opening ceremony of the 1992 Summer Olympics.

References

External links
 

1957 births
Living people
Guyanese male cyclists
Olympic cyclists of Guyana
Cyclists at the 1984 Summer Olympics
Cyclists at the 1992 Summer Olympics
Place of birth missing (living people)